Rameh-ye Pain (also Romanized as Rāmeh-ye Pā’īn and Rāmeh Pā’īn) is a village in Faravan Rural District, Kohanabad District, Aradan County, Semnan Province, Iran. At the 2006 census, its population was 138, in 41 families.

References 

Populated places in Aradan County